Ásgeir "Sigi" Sigurvinsson (born 8 May 1955 in Vestmannaeyjar) is an Icelandic retired football attacking midfielder and coach.

He spent most of his career at Standard Liège and in Germany, amassing Bundesliga totals of 211 games and 39 goals for two clubs, mainly Stuttgart.

Club career
One of the first Icelandic footballers to play in a foreign country, Ásgeir played a single game for Rangers' reserve side in late 1972 before moving to Belgian club Standard Liège in 1973. He stayed there for eight seasons, amassing more than 300 appearances overall and helping it to the 1981 Belgian Cup. Immediately after, he was bought by FC Bayern Munich, but only lasted one year.

Ásgeir then joined fellow Bundesliga team VfB Stuttgart, where he figured prominently until his retirement at 35. In his second year he scored a career-best – in Germany – 12 goals, being instrumental in a league conquest after a 32-year wait.

During his penultimate season, Ásgeir netted three times from 28 appearances as the Roten finished fifth, still adding all 12 matches (ten complete) in the side's runner-up run in the UEFA Cup. After retiring, he worked at Stuttgart for another three years, as a scout.

Between April and November 1993, Ásgeir had his first coaching experience, with Knattspyrnufélagið Fram.

International career
Ásgeir gained 45 caps for Iceland and scored five goals, his debut coming on 3 July 1972 at only 17 in a 2–5 friendly home loss against Denmark. He acted as technical director at the Football Association of Iceland for six years, and later coached the national team from 2003 until late 2005.

In November 2003, to celebrate UEFA's 50 anniversary, the Icelandic FA selected Ásgeir as its Golden Player, the most outstanding Icelandic player of the last 50 years.

Honours
ÍBV
Icelandic Cup: 1972

Standard Liège
Belgian Cup: 1980–81

Bayern Munich
DFB-Pokal: 1981–82

Stuttgart
Bundesliga: 1983–84

References

External links

1955 births
Living people
Asgeir Sigurvinsson
Asgeir Sigurvinsson
Asgeir Sigurvinsson
Association football midfielders
Asgeir Sigurvinsson
Belgian Pro League players
Standard Liège players
Bundesliga players
FC Bayern Munich footballers
VfB Stuttgart players
Asgeir Sigurvinsson
Asgeir Sigurvinsson
Expatriate footballers in Belgium
Expatriate footballers in West Germany
Asgeir Sigurvinsson
Asgeir Sigurvinsson
UEFA Golden Players
Asgeir Sigurvinsson
Asgeir Sigurvinsson
Asgeir Sigurvinsson